Dumaresq Shire was a local government area in the New England region of New South Wales, Australia.

Dumaresq Shire was proclaimed on 7 March 1906, one of 134 shires created after the passing of the Local Government (Shires) Act 1905. 

The shire office was in Armidale.  Towns and villages in the shire included  Ebor, Hillgrove and Wollomombi.

Dumaresq Shire was amalgamated with the City of Armidale to form Armidale Dumaresq Council on 21 February 2000.

References

Former local government areas of New South Wales
1906 establishments in Australia
2000 disestablishments in Australia